The Hu. Hotel is a luxury boutique hotel in Downtown Memphis, Tennessee, United States, located in the historic former Tennessee Trust Bank building.

History

Construction
Built in 1905, the 14-story Tennessee Trust Building was among downtown Memphis' first "skyscrapers." The building's architects, the firm of Charles 0. Pfeil (1871–1952) and George M. Shaw (1870–1919) were noted at the time for designing buildings with ornate, classical styling and massing. The building was constructed with a large underground vault, which is currently re-purposed as the hotel gym. The scroll pattern on the west facade of the Tennessee Trust Building is visible on other downtown Memphis buildings from the era designed by Shaw & Pfeil. For instance, the firm's Memphis Fire Engine House #1 (1910) and the Memphis Police Station (1911) are on the National Register of Historic Places. The Tennessee Trust Building was added to the National Register of Historic Places in 1982.

Hotel conversion
In 2002, Unison Hotel Co. acquired the deteriorating structure and converted it into an upscale 110-room boutique hotel, the Madison Hotel. In 2016, the hotel was sold to the Chicago-based Aparium Hotel Group, which renamed it the Hu. Hotel in 2018.

Gallery

References

Commercial buildings on the National Register of Historic Places in Tennessee
Skyscraper hotels in Memphis, Tennessee
Hotel buildings completed in 1906
Hotels established in 2002
National Register of Historic Places in Memphis, Tennessee
1906 establishments in Tennessee